Chrisso is a village in Phocis, Greece. The modern village sits north of the ancient town of Crissa, a powerful city-state of ancient Greece which gave its name to the Crissaean plain and the Crissaean Gulf and lies in the southwestern foothills of Mount Parnassus. Chrisso is 2 km southwest of Delphi, 10 km southeast of Amfissa and 6 km northeast of Itea. The Greek National Road 48 (Nafpaktos - Delphi - Livadeia) passes west of the village. Chrisso belongs to the municipality of Delphi.

Historical population

History

The town is first mentioned in Homer's Catalog of Ships, as a Phoecean settlement that participated in Trojan War (ca. 12th-13th century B.C.).
The rubble from the ancient wall of Krissa lies in the modern Stefani hill.  The ancient city was devastated by Amphictiones in the war which lasted from around 600 BC and 590 BC.  In the Crisaean fields, an ancient hippodrome is founded.

Persons
Strophilus of Crissa

References

External links

Municipality of Delphi

Populated places in Phocis
Mount Parnassus